Laetilia hulstii is a species of snout moth in the genus Laetilia. It was described by Theodore Dru Alison Cockerell in 1897. It is found in the US state of California.

Taxonomy
The species was formerly considered a synonym of Laetilia coccidivora.

References

Moths described in 1897
Phycitini